İlker Karakaş (born 11 January 1999) is a Turkish professional footballer who plays as a striker for Gençlerbirliği.

Professional career
İlker joined the Gençlerbirliği youth academy in 2011. He made his professional debut for Gençlerbirliği in a 3-2 Süper Lig loss to Kayserispor on 15 April 2018.

International career
İlker is a youth international for Turkey.

References

External links
 
 
 
 Gençlerbirliği Profile
 

1999 births
Living people
Sportspeople from İzmit
Turkish footballers
Turkey youth international footballers
Gençlerbirliği S.K. footballers
Hacettepe S.K. footballers
Süper Lig players
TFF Second League players
Association football forwards